The Beverwijk Bazaar is a covered market in Beverwijk, the Netherlands. With over 2000 shops and stalls on 75,000 m2, it claims to be the largest recreational covered market in Europe.

History
On 13 September 1980, Bart van Kampen started the "Black Market": a flea market, housed in the produce and flower auction hall of Beverwijk. With 500 stalls, the first Black Market attracted 14,000 visitors. Initially, the market was open only on Saturdays, but since the addition of the "Turkish Market" in 1982 (renamed to "Oriental Market" in 1984), it is also open on Sundays. In 1986, the "Grand Bazaar" opened its doors, followed by the "Computer Market", "Hall 30" (initially "China Town") in 2007, "Mihrab" in 2014, and the "Gold Souk" in 2015.

References

External links

Tourist attractions in North Holland
Retail markets in the Netherlands